Westinghouse Brakes may refer to:
 A Railway air brake
 Westinghouse Air Brake Company (WABCO) - US
 Westinghouse Brakes - UK